Martin Lejsal (born 16 September 1982 in Kyjov) is a Czech football goalkeeper who is currently unattached. He played in several countries, but mostly at home for FC Zbrojovka Brno.

In July 2005 he was banned for 6 months due to Caso Genoa.

External links
 1. FC Brno profile 
 
 

1982 births
Living people
Czech footballers
Czech Republic youth international footballers
Czech Republic under-21 international footballers
Association football goalkeepers
Reggina 1914 players
FC Slovan Liberec players
Venezia F.C. players
Calcio Padova players
FC Fastav Zlín players
FC Zbrojovka Brno players
SC Heerenveen players
Czech First League players
Eredivisie players
Serie A players
Serie B players
Czech expatriate footballers
Expatriate footballers in Italy
Czech expatriate sportspeople in Italy
Expatriate footballers in the Netherlands
Czech expatriate sportspeople in the Netherlands
People from Kyjov
Expatriate footballers in Russia
FC Rostov players
Sportspeople from the South Moravian Region